Wang Bin (born April 14, 1994), is a Chinese professional wrestler, using the ring name Tian Bing. He is best known for his time in WWE, and for being the first wrestler from Mainland China to compete in the company.

Professional wrestling career

Inoki Genome Federation (2013–2016)
Wang debuted in the Inoki Genome Federation (IGF) on December 31, 2013, defeating Kendo Kashin at the Inoki Bom-Ba-Ye 2013 event. Wang continued to wrestle for IGF for three years before leaving for the WWE. He wrestled his last IGF match on May 29, 2016, teaming with Alexander Otsuka to defeat the team of Pancrase legends Masakatsu Funaki and Takaku Fuke at the Genome36 event.

WWE (2016–2018)
On June 16, 2016, WWE officially announced Wang's signing to the company. Although being promoted as WWE's first mainland Chinese developmental talent, Wang was preceded by Kenny Li six years before him.

On the October 26, 2016 episode NXT, Wang made his television debut under the ring name Tian Bing, teaming with Ho Ho Lun in a losing effort against #DIY in the first round of the Dusty Rhodes Tag Team Classic tournament. He competed in the André the Giant Memorial battle royal at WrestleMania 33, where he eliminated Fandango and Tyler Breeze before being eliminated by Dolph Ziggler. Bing would make an appearance on the prerecorded episode of NXT on October 17, 2018, teaming with Rocky, in a losing effort to the team of Oney Lorcan and Danny Burch. He was released from his contract on October 19.

References

External links

1994 births
Living people
Chinese male professional wrestlers
Sportspeople from Anhui
Chinese expatriate sportspeople in the United States